Joan Shea (formerly Joan Burke) is a former Canadian politician and Cabinet minister in Newfoundland and Labrador. From 2003 to 2014 Shea served as the member of the House of Assembly (MHA) for the district of St. George's-Stephenville East. Shea was the first person holding a BSW to serve in the NL legislature. Shea was also the first woman to serve as Government House Leader in the province's history.

During her entire career as a MHA, Shea served as a minister in the Cabinets of Danny Williams, Kathy Dunderdale and Tom Marshall. Shea held the posts of Minister of Education, Minister of Advanced Education and Skills, Minister of Human Resources, Labour and Employment, Minister of Child, Youth and Family Services and Minister Responsible for the Status of Women.  During her political career, Shea was also responsible for Newfoundland and Labrador Housing, the Labour Relations Agency, and Workplace Health and Safety Commission.

As Minister, Shea was instrumental in the establishment of the newly created Department of Child, Youth and Family Services and also led the development of the Department of Advanced Education and Skills.

Before entering politics she worked as a Parole Officer with the Correctional Service of Canada in Ontario and Newfoundland. Shea holds a BSW from Memorial University and an MSW from the University of Toronto.

Politics
Shea was elected to politics in the 2003 provincial election as a member of the Progressive Conservative Party. Following the election she was sworn into Cabinet as the Minister of Human Resources and Employment and as the Minister Responsible for the Status of Women. In 2005, Premier Danny Williams appointed Shea as the Minister of Education.

In the 2007 general election Shea was re-elected with 75% of the vote, up from 53% in 2003. Shea remained as Minister of Education following the election and in May 2008 was also named Government House Leader, becoming the first woman appointed to this position in the history of the province.

In April 2009, Shea was appointed Minister of the newly created Department of Child, Youth, and Family Services. She became the acting minister of Human Resources, Labour and Employment in December 2010, and the following month she was re-appointed as Minister of Education.

Shea had been mentioned as a possible contender for leader of the Progressive Conservatives and though following the resignation of Premier Williams in 2010 it was thought that Shea may try to succeed him, ultimately she did not.

Following the 2011 provincial election, Shea was appointed the Minister of the newly created Department of Advanced Education and Skills, which combines the post-secondary education component of the Department of Education and most of the former Department of Human Resources, Labour and Employment. She resigned from politics on June 2, 2014.

Electoral record

|-

|-

|-

|NDP
|Bernice Hancock
|align="right"|705
|align="right"|16.51%
|align="right"|
|-

|Independent
|Dean Simon
|align="right"|63
|align="right"|1.48%
|align="right"|
|}

|-

|-

|}

|-

|-

|-

|Independent
|Nancy Critchley
|align="right"|170
|align="right"|3.06%
|align="right"|
|}

References

Members of the Executive Council of Newfoundland and Labrador
Progressive Conservative Party of Newfoundland and Labrador MHAs
Living people
Year of birth missing (living people)
Women MHAs in Newfoundland and Labrador
21st-century Canadian politicians
21st-century Canadian women politicians
Women government ministers of Canada
Canadian social workers